Jingfengmen station is a station on Lines 14 and 19 of the Beijing Subway in Fengtai District.

Opening time
Line 14 (middle section): December 31, 2021

Line 19: July 30, 2022

Description
During early planning stages, it was known as You'anmenwai station. In October 2015, it was renamed to Jingfengmen station. The name "Jingfengmen" derives from the old gate in the Jin dynasty capital, Zhongdu.

Platform layout
Both Line 14 and Line 19 stations have underground island platforms.

Exits
There are 4 exits, lettered B, D, E and G. Exit D is accessible via an elevator.

Nearby
Beijing Liao and Jin Dynasty City Wall Museum, 500 meters west of the metro station

Gallery

References

External links

Beijing Subway stations in Fengtai District
Railway stations in China opened in 2021